Thomas Carroll Group plc is a British provider of business and personal insurance, financial management, health & safety and employment law consulting services.

At the British Insurance Awards in 2014, Thomas Carroll Brokers were named "Insurance Brokers of the Decade".

The company has been regularly included in the Sunday Times Top 100 Best Small Company to work for.

On 1 April 2016 the group bought the Monmouthshire Insurance Services business from Monmouthshire Building Society.

References

External links
Thomas Carroll Group timeline

Insurance agents
Financial services companies of Wales
Financial services companies established in 1972
1972 establishments in Wales